Advanced Computer Software Group Ltd. (operating as Advanced) is a British private company founded by Vin Murria in 2008 with its main headquarters in Slough, Berkshire. It provides information technology services including hosting and cloud based systems to the NHS and many other organisations. Through various acquisitions, in 2016 it became the third largest software provider in the UK market while employing over 2,400 people with a customer base of more than 20,000 organisations. Later in the year it would go on to rebrand itself to "Advanced" while opening a new central headquarters in Birmingham's Mailbox.

History
Advanced was founded by Vin Murria in 2008. Originally listed on the Alternative Investment Market in 2008 with a cash value of £3 million it was bought by Vista Equity Partners in 2014 for £765 million. From the 18% stake Murria held in Advanced she took £140.2m from the sale making her one of the wealthiest women in the UK.  Murria was awarded an OBE for services to the UK digital economy and advancing women in the software sector in the 2018 New Year Honours.

At the time of sale, Vista brought in a new leadership team including current chief executive officer Gordon Wilson, and chief financial officer Andrew Hicks.

In August 2019, Vista sold a 50% stake in Advanced to BC Partners for £2 billion including debt.

Health and Care Cyber Incident 
In August 2022, Advanced experienced a cybersecurity incident caused by LockBit 3.0 ransomware. Adastra, Caresys, Odyssey, Carenotes, Crosscare, Staffplan and eFinancials products were all affected, with varying downtime and recovery. As of October 2022, some systems are still unavailable.

Perpetrators of the attack were able to extract information relating to 16 Staffplan and Caresys customers.

Locations 
Advanced's head office is located in Mailbox, Birmingham with other office locations in Newcastle, Ashford, Dublin, York and Willerby. The US head office is located in Atlanta, Georgia. Advanced also have offices in Bangalore, Karnataka and Baroda, Gujarat, India which is where the primary development function is located.

Acquisitions

List of Software
 Cloud School (formerly Progresso)
 Facility CMIS Administration
 Scheduler
 Facility ePortal
 CMIS
 CMIS Go
 FM Easy
 OpenAccounts
 Advanced HR (formerly Cloud HR)
 OpenPeople
 OpenWMS
 Odyssey
 Exchequer
 
 
 ProAchieve
 ProMonitor
 ProSolution
 TALENT Ticketing Solutions
 Integra
 Business Cloud Essentials
 Advanced Financials (formerly Cloud Financials)
 Staffplan
 Caresys
 Carenotes
 Adastra
 Crosscare
 V1 Document Management
 Advanced Data Automation (formerly Cloud trade)

References

Private providers of NHS services
Software companies of England
Companies based in Slough